I due mafiosi (literally "Two Mafiamen") is a 1964 Italian-Spanish crime comedy film directed by Giorgio Simonelli and starring the comedy duo Franco and Ciccio. It is a parody of Alberto Lattuada's Mafioso.

Plot

Cast 
 Franco Franchi as Franco Fisichella 
 Ciccio Ingrassia as  Ciccio Spampinato
 Aroldo Tieri as Commissioner Dupont
 Mischa Auer as  Mischa
 Gino Buzzanca as Don Calogero Sparatore
  José Riesgo as Don Fifì, aka the Moroccan
 Moira Orfei as  Claudette
 Isabella Biagini as  Jacqueline
 Silvia Solar as Clementine
  Mario Frera as  Director 
  Pino Renzi as  Rosario
 Piero Gerlini as French Customs Officer
  Nino Fuscagni as Lido's Waiter

References

External links

Films directed by Giorgio Simonelli
1960s crime comedy films
Italian crime comedy films
Films with screenplays by Giovanni Grimaldi
1964 comedy films
1964 films
1960s Italian films